Hansa Tonstudio is a recording studio located in the Kreuzberg district of Berlin, Germany. The studio, famous for its Meistersaal recording hall, is situated approximately 150 metres from the former Berlin Wall, giving rise to its former nicknames of "Hansa Studio by the Wall" or "Hansa by the Wall".

The Meistersaal has been fully restored and is now used for concerts and other events as well as recording.

History
The studio was originally built in 1913 as a guildhall for the Berlin Builder’s Society and was later used as a cabaret and chamber music concert hall during the Weimar era.

The Hansa Records label was founded in 1962 (one year after the building of the Berlin Wall) by brothers Peter and Thomas Meisel in the Wilmersdorf quarter of West Berlin. From 1965, they temporarily rented the Ariola production facilities in the Meistersaal location but also built their own Studio I on Nestorstrasse in the Halensee neighbourhood, which opened in 1973. Nevertheless, Hansa had to abandon its own production facilities the next year, and from 1974 again rented the Meistersaal location (Studio II) on Köthener Strasse.

Meanwhile, the Meistersaal, noted for its outstanding acoustics, was used not only for light music productions but also for classical music recordings. In the early and mid-1980s, all productions were overseen by English record producer Michael Blakey. The studios have played host to many well-known acts, including Tangerine Dream, David Bowie, Brian Eno, Iggy Pop, U2, Nick Cave and the Bad Seeds, Claw Boys Claw, Depeche Mode, Marillion, Siouxsie and the Banshees, Killing Joke, Boney M. and most recently Manic Street Preachers, R.E.M., Snow Patrol, Kent, Living Things and Go Go Berlin. Bowie is said to have written Heroes at a window of the studio, from which he saw his producer, Tony Visconti, kiss backing vocalist Antonia Maass, an image that made it into the song's lyrics.

The number of notable recordings and the acoustic quality, especially that of the Meistersaal, have given the studio near legendary status, especially within the post-punk and synthpop genres.

References in popular culture 
Martin Gore recorded Depeche Mode's "Somebody" naked in the Meistersaal.

Anton Corbijn shot parts of the video for U2's "One" at Hansa.

In 2018, the studio was the subject of a documentary feature by filmmaker Mike Christie titled Hansa Studios: By The Wall 1976-90, which aired across Europe on Sky Arts and Sky Arte.

Selected recordings

1976 - The Devil Is Loose by Asha Puthli
1977 – Low by David Bowie
1977 – "Heroes" by David Bowie
1977 – The Idiot by Iggy Pop
1977 – Lust for Life by Iggy Pop
1979 – Force Majeure by Tangerine Dream
1982 – Baal by David Bowie
1983 – Construction Time Again by Depeche Mode
1984 – Night Time by Killing Joke 
1984 – Brilliant Trees by David Sylvian 
1984 – The Firstborn Is Dead by Nick Cave and The Bad Seeds
1984 – Some Great Reward by Depeche Mode
1985 – Misplaced Childhood by Marillion
1986 – Black Celebration by Depeche Mode
1986 – Tinderbox by Siouxsie and the Banshees
1986 – Brighter Than a Thousand Suns by Killing Joke
1986 – Your Funeral... My Trial by Nick Cave and The Bad Seeds 
1987 – The Ideal Copy by Wire
1987 – Midnight to Midnight by The Psychedelic Furs 
1988 – A Fierce Pancake by Stump
1990 – Bossanova by Pixies
1991 – Achtung Baby by U2
2008 – A Hundred Million Suns by Snow Patrol
2008 – Diamond Hoo Ha by Supergrass
2008 – Ett Brus by Ossler 
2009 – Röd by Kent
2010 – Tiger Suit by KT Tunstall
2011 – Collapse into Now by R.E.M.
2011 – Schiffsverkehr by Herbert Grönemeyer
2013 – Rewind the Film by Manic Street Preachers
2014 – Futurology by Manic Street Preachers
2014 – Siren Charms by In Flames
2014 – Dauernd jetzt by Herbert Grönemeyer
2015 – Es or S by Ling tosite Sigure
2016 – Secret Sensation by TK from Ling tosite Sigure
2017 – Hansa Studios Session by Rome
2017 – Mismo Sitio, Distinto Lugar by Vetusta Morla
2018 – Hansa Session (EP) by Chvrches
2020 – Hotspot by Pet Shop Boys
2020 – Live Vol.1 (album) by Parcels

References

External links
 

Recording studios in Germany